Lady Holland was launched in 1811 at Rochester, as a West Indiaman. She underwent one maritime incident in 1812. She continued sailing to the West Indies until 1826. Then she began sailing to India uner a license from the British East India Company. She wrecked in February 1830 on the outbound leg of her third voyage to Bengal.

Career
Lady Holland first appeared in Lloyd's Register in 1811.

Lady Holland, Sullivan, master, was run ashore at Savanna-la-Mar, Jamaica on 1 July 1812. She was on a voyage from Jamaica to London.

On 1 July 1813 Lady Holland, Foubister, master, sailed with the fleet homeward bound from Jamaica. She was missing on the 21st and had lost her foremast running into Jane.

In 1813 the EIC had lost its monopoly on the trade between India and Britain. British ships were then free to sail to India or the Indian Ocean under a license from the EIC. On 30 April 1826 Lady Holland, Snell, master, sailed from Portsmouth, bound for Madras and Bengal. Homeward bound, she sailed from Madras on 26 October, and the Cape on 15 January 1827. She sailed from Saint Helena on 5 February, passed Ascension Island that same day, and arrived in London on 30 March. 

Lady Holland made a second such voyage. She left on her third voyage to Bengal on 4 October, 1829.

Fate
Lady Holland, Snell, master, wrecked on Dassen Island, Cape of Good Hope, on 13 February 1830. All on board were rescued. She was on a voyage from London to Bengal. All aboard reached the island in the ship's boats. It was expected that much of her cargo, consisting of Madeira wine in casks, would be saved.

Citations and references
Citations

References
 

1811 ships
Age of Sail merchant ships of England
Maritime incidents in 1812
Maritime incidents in February 1830